Kirbys Mills may refer to:

Kirbys Mills, New Jersey
Kirby's Mill in Medford, New Jersey